Doctor Hook, later released as Sylvia's Mother, is the debut studio album by American country rock band Dr. Hook & the Medicine Show, released in 1972.

Track listing 

All songs written by Shel Silverstein except where noted.

Personnel
Dr. Hook & the Medicine Show
 Ray Sawyer – lead vocals, guitar
 Dennis Locorriere – lead vocals, rhythm guitar, bass
 George Cummings – steel guitar, lead guitar
 Billy Francis – keyboards, backing vocals
 Jay David – drums, backing vocals

Production
David Brown – engineer
Ron Coro – art direction, design
George Engfer – engineer
Ron Haffkine – producer
Glenn Kolotkin – engineer
Mike Larner – engineer
Tom Lubin – engineer
Roy Segal – engineer
Ken Walz – photography

Charts

Release history

Certifications

References

External links
 Dr. Hook & The Medicine Show - Dr. Hook (Album) at iTunes Music Australia

1972 debut albums
Dr. Hook & the Medicine Show albums
Albums produced by Ron Haffkine
Columbia Records albums
CBS Records albums
Harmony Records albums